Tư Nghĩa is a rural district (huyện) of Quảng Ngãi province in the South Central Coast region of Vietnam. As of 2003 the district had a population of 178,132. The district covers an area of 227 km². The district capital lies at La Hà.

References

Districts of Quảng Ngãi province